Robert James Creighton (1835 – 22 May 1893) was a 19th-century Member of Parliament in the Auckland Region, New Zealand.

Early life and newspaper career
Creighton was born in Derry, Ireland, in 1835. He was an apprentice compositor with the Londonderry Sentinel, before becoming a reporter and then member of the editorial staff of that newspaper. In the early 1860s he emigrated to New Zealand, and in 1862 became the co-owner of The Southern Cross newspaper in Auckland. Following that newspaper's purchase by Julius Vogel in 1868, Creighton established the short-lived Free Press. He later served as editor of the New Zealand Times and the New Zealand Herald.

He was briefly a resident of Hawaii, where he was editor of the Pacific Commercial Advertiser in 1886, and also Minister of Foreign Affairs to King Kalākaua.

Political career

Creighton represented the Parnell electorate from 1865 to 1866, when he retired. He then represented the Newton electorate from 1869 to 1870, when he retired. He then represented the Eden electorate from 1871 to 1875, when he retired.

Later life
Creighton moved to San Francisco, where he was agent for the Government of New Zealand. During a short residence at Honolulu, he became a member of the Government of Hawaii. He died suddenly at San Francisco, leaving a widow, a son, and a daughter.

His son Charles F. Creighton was the Attornery General for the Kingdom of Hawaii.

References
 This article incorporates text from a publication now in the public domain:

External links

 

1835 births
1893 deaths
Writers from Derry (city)
Irish emigrants to New Zealand (before 1923)
New Zealand journalists
New Zealand editors
New Zealand magazine editors
Members of the New Zealand House of Representatives
Hawaiian Kingdom Foreign Ministers
Members of the Hawaiian Kingdom House of Nobles
New Zealand MPs for Auckland electorates
19th-century New Zealand politicians
19th-century New Zealand journalists